Lorena Ivette Arias Rodríguez (born 25 January 1983), known as Lorena Arias, is a Mexican former professional tennis player.

Biography
Arias was born into a Mexico City family with a history in the sport of volleyball. Her father coached volleyball and her mother, María del Carmen, represented Mexico at the 1968 Summer Olympics.

Before joining the professional tour, Arias played four seasons of college tennis at Washington State. She is a three-time medalist for Mexico in the Summer Universiade, including the country's first ever tennis medal in 2003, partnering Erika Valdés in the women's doubles.

From 2004 to 2008, Arias competed on the professional tour, primarily on the ITF circuit. In 2005 she featured in the qualifying draws of WTA Tour tournaments in Acapulco and Bogota. She played doubles in two Fed Cup ties for Mexico in 2008, against Colombia and Canada.

ITF circuit finals

Doubles: 14 (2–12)

Notes

References

External links
 
 
 

1983 births
Living people
Mexican female tennis players
Washington State Cougars women's tennis players
Universiade medalists in tennis
Universiade silver medalists for Mexico
Universiade bronze medalists for Mexico
Tennis players from Mexico City
Medalists at the 2003 Summer Universiade
Medalists at the 2005 Summer Universiade
21st-century Mexican women